"Drop" is a single by alternative hip hop group The Pharcyde, released in 1995 as the second single for the group's second album, Labcabincalifornia. The single contains a vocal sample of the Beastie Boys song "The New Style", using the titular "mmm..... drop" line delivered during a drop to create its hook.

Music video 

The music video for "Drop" was directed by Spike Jonze and filmed in Los Angeles. The video features footage of the group performing the song backwards, replayed backwards, which when combined with the chopped, spacey beat of the song gives the video a slight surrealistic quality. The group also worked with linguistic experts to recite the entire song backwards. Ad Rock and Mike D of the Beastie Boys make a brief cameo.  The end of the video also features art from professional skateboarder/artist Mark Gonzales.

Track listings 

A-Side
Drop (Beatminerz Remix) (4:15)
Drop (Radio Remix) (3:45)
Drop (Beatminerz Remix Instrumental) (4:15)

B-Side
Runnin' (Jay Dee Remix) (4:30)
Y? (Be Like That) (Jay Dee Remix) (4:45)
Y? (Be Like That) (LP Version) (4:50)
Y? (Be Like That) (Jay Dee Remix Instrumental) (4:45)

Charts

References

External links

1995 singles
The Pharcyde songs
Song recordings produced by J Dilla
Music videos directed by Spike Jonze
1995 songs
Delicious Vinyl singles